Glad Music is the sixth vinyl record album by American multi-instrumentalist R. Stevie Moore (RSM). It was the second of four RSM albums released by New Rose Records in Paris. Glad Music differed from most Moore record albums by being almost exclusively recorded in a professional 8- and 16-track studio. The record sleeve's art design mimics the UK version of the Beatles' 1964 soundtrack album A Hard Day's Night. The title "Glad Music" was a nod to the music publishing company of the same name.

Earlier recordings of some of the songs had appeared on other albums, such as 1978's Delicate Tension. "Why Should I Love You?", was later covered by the English indie rock band the Vaccines and released as a single. "Along Comes Mary" was originally recorded by the Association in 1966. "Colliding Circles" gets its name from the title of a fake unreleased Beatles song invented by humorist Martin Lewis. (Moore also wrote and recorded "Pink Litmus Paper Shirt", the name of another of Lewis' faux Beatles tunes; the song is included as a bonus track on a 2017 CD reissue of Glad Music.)

Track listing

Note
 "Part of the Problem" and "I Love You So Much It Hurts" are the same recordings that originally appeared on Clack! (1980).

References

External links
 RSM's Glad Music webpage
 Gladmusic on Bandcamp
 Glad Music on MySpace
 

R. Stevie Moore albums
1986 albums
Psychedelic pop albums